Joseph Haydn's Symphony No. 1 in D major, Hoboken I/1, was written in 1759 in Dolní Lukavice, while in the service of Count Morzin. While it is reliably known that No. 1 was written in 1759, H. C. Robbins Landon cannot rule out that No. 2, No. 4, or both could have been composed in 1757 or 1758.

Symphony No. 1 is scored for 2 oboes (or possibly flute), bassoon, 2 horns, strings and continuo. Like most of the early symphonies by Haydn and his contemporaries, it is in three movements:

Presto, 
Andante in G major, 
Presto, 

The first movement opens with a Mannheim crescendo which is in contrast to the rest of the symphony, which is more Austrian in character.

The first movement has "frequent passages where" the violas are "used with some ingenuity and quite separately from the bass line."

Notes

References

External links 
 

Symphony 001
Compositions in D major
1759 compositions